The Central District of Fariman County is a district (bakhsh) in Fariman County, Razavi Khorasan Province, Iran. At the 2006 census, its population was 63,694, in 15,682 families.  The district has two cities: Fariman and Farhadgerd.   The district has three rural districts (dehestan): Balaband Rural District, Fariman Rural District, and Sang Bast Rural District.

References 

Districts of Razavi Khorasan Province
Fariman County